Streptomyces kaempferi is a bacterium species from the genus of Streptomyces which has been isolated from hay meadow soil from the Cockle Park Experimental Farm in Northumberland in the United Kingdom.

See also 
 List of Streptomyces species

References

Further reading

External links
Type strain of Streptomyces kaempferi at BacDive -  the Bacterial Diversity Metadatabase	

kaempferi
Bacteria described in 2013